Altınbaş can refer to:

 Altınbaş, Çorum
 Altınbaş University